The Round Barn, Washington Township is a historic building located south of Janesville, Iowa in Black Hawk County, United States. It was built in 1917 as a dairy barn. The building is a true round barn that measures  in diameter.  The structure is constructed in clay tile and features an aerator and a two-pitch roof. It was built around a silo with a water tank on top of it. While that is typical of this type of structure, it is the only one known to exist in Iowa. It has been listed on the National Register of Historic Places since 1986.

References

Infrastructure completed in 1917
Buildings and structures in Black Hawk County, Iowa
National Register of Historic Places in Black Hawk County, Iowa
Barns on the National Register of Historic Places in Iowa
Round barns in Iowa